Charles Kenny McClatchy, better known as C. K. McClatchy (November 1, 1858 – April 27, 1936), was the editor of The Sacramento Bee and a founder of McClatchy Newspapers, the family-owned company that was forerunner to The McClatchy Company.

McClatchy attended Santa Clara University, where he earned a Masters of Arts in 1901. He took over the Sacramento paper upon the death of his father, James McClatchy, and led it into the 20th century, continuing the newspaper's battles for labor rights; against the abuses of big mining, the railroads, and corrupt government; and fiercely defending a publication's right to editorial freedom.  He was instrumental in the founding of The Fresno Bee in 1922 and the establishment of The Modesto Bee with its purchase in 1924. McClatchy also owned KFBK (AM), an AM radio station in Sacramento.

McClatchy had a problem with alcoholism. For a month near the end of McClatchy's life, Ralph Berry Kelley, trained nurse, graduate of Bowdoin College in Maine, and about one generation younger than McClatchy, cared for McClatchy. McClatchy made good progress during that month, so the McClatchy family released Kelley from his service to McClatchy. McClatchy reverted to alcohol and died about one month later.

His son, Carlos, who had been groomed to take over the business, died in 1933; McClatchy then turned to his daughter, Eleanor, who after his death became president of the McClatchy Company and led it for the next forty years. Carlos's son Charles later served as president of McClatchy Newspapers between 1979 and 1989.

C.K. McClatchy High School in Sacramento, which opened in 1937 about a year after his death, was named in honor of McClatchy.

References

External links
 The California Newspaper Hall of Fame
 "C. K. McClatchy", Media Museum of Northern California

American publishers (people)
American male journalists
Journalists from California
Businesspeople from Sacramento, California
1858 births
1936 deaths
McClatchy people
Santa Clara University alumni